Trevor Ogden may refer to:

 Trevor Ogden (Coronation Street), a character on the British soap opera Coronation Street
 Trevor Ogden (footballer), footballer for Manchester City